Benjamín Delgado (1 June 1897 – 4 November 1953) was an Argentine footballer. He played in nine matches for the Argentina national football team from 1923 to 1926. He was also part of Argentina's squad for the 1926 South American Championship.

References

External links
 

1897 births
1953 deaths
Argentine footballers
Argentina international footballers
Place of birth missing
Association football forwards
Club Atlético Atlanta footballers
Boca Juniors footballers
Argentinos Juniors footballers
Club Atlético Tigre footballers